Asia Masters Athletics one of six continental based regional affiliates of World Masters Athletics (WMA), the global governing body for the division of Masters athletics.  The current president of the organization is Viwat Vigrantanoros, who represents the Sports Authority of Thailand.  Sivapragasam Sivasambo, from Malaysia is the organization's Secretary and is the representing delegate to the WMA General Meeting which is held in conjunction with the World Masters Athletics Championships.  The past president was Kiyoshi Konoike who is also the General Secretary Japan Masters, Vigrantanoros previously had been Vice President of Stadia.

The member nations of Asia Masters Athletics parallel those of the IAAF (the world governing body for the sport of athletics).

Asia Masters Athletics conducts the Asia Masters Athletics Championships, a biannual regional competition for all affiliated countries, held in opposite years from the World Masters Athletics Championships and conducts the site survey and selection for those championships.  Also as a regional affiliate, Asia Masters Athletics is an intermediate validating step for all Masters Athletics World Records and for keeping the regional Asia Masters Athletics records.

References

External links
 Asia Masters Athletics official website

Athletics organizations
Sports governing bodies in Asia
Athletics in Asia